Tata Beach is a beach and small coastal settlement of predominantly holiday houses in the South Island, New Zealand.

Demographics 

There were 63 households. There were 87 males and 84 females, giving a sex ratio of 1.04 males per female. The median age was 38.9 years (compared with 37.4 years nationally), with 30 people (17.5%) aged under 15 years, 33 (19.3%) aged 15 to 29, 84 (49.1%) aged 30 to 64, and 24 (14.0%) aged 65 or older.

Ethnicities were 94.7% European/Pākehā, 12.3% Māori, 1.8% Asian, and 1.8% other ethnicities (totals add to more than 100% since people could identify with multiple ethnicities).

Although some people objected to giving their religion, 70.2% had no religion, 21.1% were Christian and 1.8% had other religions.

Of those at least 15 years old, 21 (14.9%) people had a bachelor or higher degree, and 33 (23.4%) people had no formal qualifications. The median income was $29,600, compared with $31,800 nationally. The employment status of those at least 15 was that 78 (55.3%) people were employed full-time, 27 (19.1%) were part-time, and 3 (2.1%) were unemployed.

Tata Beach is part of the Pōhara-Abel Tasman SA2 statistical area.

References

Populated places in the Tasman District
Beaches of the Tasman District
Populated places around Golden Bay / Mohua
Golden Bay